Make Mine Mink is a 1960 British comedy farce film directed by Robert Asher and featuring Terry-Thomas, Athene Seyler, Hattie Jacques and Billie Whitelaw. The screenplay concerns a group of eccentric misfits who go on a spree, stealing mink coats for charity in a Robin Hood-style gang. It was based on the play Breath of Spring by Peter Coke, and its sequels. Seyler and Elspeth Duxbury reprised their stage roles from the  London production of  Breath of Spring.

Plot
A group of lodgers - Major Rayne, Nanette ("Nan") and "Pinkie" Pinkerton - staying at the Kensington apartment of Dame Beatrice, an elderly philanthropist, are bored with their humdrum, restricted lives. Lily, Dame Bea's beautiful, young housekeeper, overhears an argument between their neighbours, the Spanagers. When Mrs. Spanager rejects her husband's gift of a mink coat due to his lies about his business trip, he pretends to throw the coat off their balcony, but actually just hides it. Lily snags it and gives it to her employer to show her gratitude for hiring her despite her criminal record. Dame Beatrice is at first delighted, but then assumes Lily has stolen it. She and the lodgers concoct a scheme to return the fur coat before its owners realize its absence. Despite several comical mishaps, the gang manage to do so using a plan drawn up by the retired Major. The four are so exhilarated by their escapade, they decide to steal more furs, presuming that intricacies of theft should prove no more difficult than was the return of the Spanagers' fur, with all the proceeds of their exploits being donated to charity.

Their attempt to rob Madame Spolinski's boutique goes somewhat awry, due to Pinkie's ineptitude, but they still manage to get away with a fur coat. However, they have not considered how to dispose of their loot. The Major, pretending he is writing a book on delinquency, gets Lily to direct him to a shady café in Limehouse in search of a fence. It turns out that Lily is behind the times; it is now run by the Salvation Army. Meanwhile, they have to hide their activities from Lily, who is now dating policeman Jim Benham.

When they catch a burglar hiding under Pinkie's bed, they agree to let him go on condition that he direct them to a fence. Dame Beatrice goes to make contact with the fence, only to discover, to her chagrin, that it is her own nephew Freddie. The £550 he pays her goes to an orphanage in dire straits. The quartet then go on a burglary spree. Their amateurish escapades become widely reported in the newspapers, one of which calls them "superannuated Beatniks". On more than one occasion, they narrowly evade capture.

Then Lily discovers what they are doing. Horrified, she explains how lucky they are not to be behind bars and makes them promise to stop their criminal activities. However, when Dame Beatrice receives an urgent request for money for a children's home, they decide to pull off one last job. The Major plans a raid on a high-tone, but illegal gambling party. Dame Beatrice pretends to be a gambler, while the rest of the group dress up as police officers. They stage a phoney raid of the premises, planning to make away with all the fur coats in the cloakroom, but a real police raid minutes later tests their mettle. They manage to escape with a few furs.

Lily confronts them when she sees the new furs. When Inspector Pape from Scotland Yard turns up, they expect to be arrested. However, they are relieved to discover the inspector has come round regarding a fur reported stolen from Nan (by Pinkie, as it turns out). Once the inspector departs, a furious Lily extracts a promise to stop stealing furs.

Then another plea reaches Dame Beatrice for a sorely needed charitable donation. She reminds her partners in crime that they promised not to steal furs only. When Lily and Jim go to see the Crown Jewels, as they are leaving, Lily thinks the four Beefeaters heading into the chamber holding the jewellery look familiar, then dismisses the fantastic idea. However, her instincts are correct.

Cast
 Terry-Thomas as Major Albert Rayne CB CMG MVO
 Athene Seyler as Dame Beatrice Appleby DBE
 Hattie Jacques as Nanette "Nan" Parry
 Elspeth Duxbury as Elizabeth "Pinkie" Pinkerton
 Billie Whitelaw as Lily Thompson
 Jack Hedley as Jim Benham
 Raymond Huntley as Inspector Pape
 Irene Handl as Madame Spolinski
 Sydney Tafler as Mr. Spanager
 Joan Heal as Mrs. Spanager
 Penny Morrell as Gertrude, Madame Spolinski's shop assistant
 Freddie Frinton as Drunk
 Michael Balfour as Doorman
 Noel Purcell as Burglar
 Kenneth Williams as Hon. Freddie Warrington
 Dorinda Stevens as Jean (uncredited)
 Denis Shaw as café proprietor (uncredited)
 Michael Peake as café customer (uncredited)
 Peter Vaughan as police officer (uncredited)
 Walter Horsbrugh as children's home head (uncredited)
 John Van Eyssen as gambling den proprietor (uncredited)

Reception
Bosley Crowther, critic for The New York Times, gave it a generally favourable review, writing, "it has bumpy stretches where the script writer's clumsy jointing shows. But, on the whole, it is a comical conveyance for the cut-ups of its skillful cast." Variety reported, "The humor is episodic, but Robert Asher has directed the lively screenplay briskly enough, and the camerawork is okay. The four members of the gang do their chores admirably, with Seyler outstanding." Dennis Schwartz was less enthused, giving Make Mine Mink a grade of C+ and stating, "The Brit humor from the implausible farce escaped me, though the dicey comedy of errors venture might appeal to fans of Terry-Thomas – someone I never acquired a taste for."

References

External links 
 
 
 

1960 films
1960s crime comedy films
British crime comedy films
1960s English-language films
British films based on plays
Films directed by Robert Asher
Films set in London
Films shot at Pinewood Studios
1960 comedy films
1960s British films